Tanawat Panchang (born August 12, 1997) is a Thai professional footballer who plays as a centre-back for Samut Sakhon in the Thai League 2.

References

External links
 https://www.livesoccer888.com/players/Thanawat-Panchang
 https://int.soccerway.com/players/thanawat-panchang/440899/
 https://www.siamsporttalk.com/en/player-sport/player/2369.html

1997 births
Living people
Tanawat Panchang
Tanawat Panchang
Association football defenders
Tanawat Panchang
Tanawat Panchang
Tanawat Panchang